Cramton is a surname. Notable people with the surname include:

Louis C. Cramton (1875–1966), American politician
Roger C. Cramton (1929–2017), American legal scholar

References

English-language surnames